Eois percisa is a moth in the  family Geometridae. It is found in Peru.

The wingspan is about 21 mm. The forewings are pale yellow, with lilac-grey wavy cross-lines parallel to the oblique outer margin. In the basal half of the wing (including the central fascia) these lines are thickened and confluent, obscuring the ground-colour except on the costa. The hindwings are similar to the forewings, but the basal third is grey and contains a large black cell-spot and a pale yellow band beyond it, which is visible (but less prominent) on the forewings also.

References

Moths described in 1907
Taxa named by William Warren (entomologist)
Eois
Moths of South America